Death Row Greatest Hits is the first greatest hits album and second double album released by Death Row Records. Released on November 26, 1996, the thirty-three song compilation contains hits by former and then-current Death Row artists as well as previously unreleased tracks and remixes. The album peaked at number 35 on the Billboard 200 and was certified platinum on August 12, 1999.

Background

2Pac's inclusion
To counter cannibalism of sales from other 1996 Death Row album releases, no songs from 2Pac's All Eyez on Me, The 7 Day Theory and Snoop Dogg's Tha Doggfather are included on the compilation. From the seven tracks on the compilation that feature 2Pac, only two were recorded during his time spent at Death Row Records; "Hit 'Em Up" and "Smile For Me Now", which are both non-album tracks. Four of the other five tracks were songs previously released under Interscope Records prior to his signing with Death Row. And one track, "Pour Out a Little Liquor", was recorded before 2Pac's time at Death Row, however, was originally released on the 1994 Death Row soundtrack, Above the Rim. The four tracks not affiliated with Death Row were able to be included as Interscope, at that time, was Death Row's parent and distributor. In 2003, tracks from the 1996 Death Row albums were featured on the compilation's follow-up, Death Row Greatest Hits, Volume 2.

Rare and exclusive music
"Dear Mama"—found on disc one of the compilation—although not listed as a remix, is a completely different mix than what is found on the single or original album release.

Disc two of the compilation is mostly made up of remixes and new tracks, notable inclusions being:
 "Let Me Ride (RMX)", a remix produced and featuring a new verse by Daz Dillinger.
 "Daydreaming", a new song by Michel'le and cover of the 1972 Aretha Franklin song, "Day Dreaming". 
 "I Get Around (RMX)", a remix featuring a chilled jazz beat and an extra verse by 2Pac. This version could originally be found on the B-side of the single release. 
 "Hit 'Em Up", a non-album 2Pac track that could previously only be found on the B-side to "How Do U Want It".
 "Who Been There, Who Done That?", a new song by J-Flexx and parody of the Dr. Dre song "Been There, Done That". 
 "Me in Your World", a new song by Tha Dogg Pound. This song was later remixed and included on the 2012 Dogg Pound compilation, Doggy Bag.
 "Smile For Me Now", a new song by 2Pac and Scarface which was released as a single in remix form three months later, retitled, "Smile".

Diss tracks aimed at Dr. Dre
Following suit with 2Pac's The 7 Day Theory, Death Row continues to show animosity towards former signee and co-founder, Dr. Dre, by including a diss track directed towards the rapper/producer on each disc of the release. The diss tracks included were:

 "No Vaseline" by Ice Cube; a 1991 diss track aimed at Dr. Dre and fellow N.W.A group members. Although the song had no association with Death Row Records prior to the release of the compilation, the song was able to be included as Priority Records, the songs distributor, and Interscope Records, the albums distributor, are both divisions of Universal Music Group. 
 "Who Been There, Who Done That?", written and performed by one of Dr. Dre's former ghostwriters, J-Flexx, is an album exclusive and parody of Dr. Dre's post-Death Row single, "Been There, Done That"—a song which was also written by J-Flexx. The diss track, which takes shots at Dr. Dre for allegedly stealing songwriting and production credits as well as taking the royalties, was released as a single in promotion for the album. In the song's music video, Dr. Dre, clearly depicted as a closeted homosexual, grasps with the reality that the truth—that he has been receiving undeserved credit for the writing of several hit songs—has been uncovered. As the music video progresses, the fictionalised Dr. Dre has to deal with bailiffs entering his home and taking away his possessions.
 "Fuck Wit Dre Day (Remix)" by Jewell; At the beginning, she sings the familiar vocals from the original song, but then adding her own lyrics, but also declaring "Ms. Death Row Is In The House".

Although it's heavily rumoured, one can also presume Suge Knight is responsible for casting the inklings of disdain, as he, CEO of Death Row Records and known instigator, served as executive producer on the album.

Artwork

The album's front cover centres on the Death Row Records logo—a death row inmate sat in an electric chair—which was created by Henry "Hen Dog" Smith. However, this version of the Death Row symbol—not by Smith—does away with the bag over the inmates head and displays an electric current running through the inmates body. The album's cover and insert artwork was designed by California based artist, Ronald "Riskie" Brent. Brent, a recurrent Death Row collaborator, was commissioned to create numerous covers and inserts for albums such as All Eyez on Me, The 7 Day Theory, Tha Doggfather, Christmas on Death Row and Retaliation, Revenge and Get Back.

Track listing

Sample credits
Track 1 contains samples from "I Want'a Do Something Freaky to You" as recorded by Leon Haywood and interpolations from "Uphill Peace of Mind" written by Frederick Knight
Track 2 contains samples from "I Get Lifted" as recorded by George McCrae and interpolations from "Watching You" written by Slave
Track 3 contains samples from "Love That Will Not Die" as recorded by Johnny "Guitar" Watson
Track 5 contains interpolations from "Atomic Dog" written by George Clinton, Garry Shider & David Spradley
Track 6 contains interpolations from "Funk You Up" written by The Sequence and Sylvia Robinson
Track 7 contains samples from "Dazz" as recorded by Brick
Track 8 contains interpolations from "If It Ain't One Thing, It's Another" written by Richard "Dimples" Fields
Track 9 contains samples from "Be Alright" as recorded by Roger Troutman and interpolations from "O-o-h Child" written by Stan Vincent
Track 11 contains samples from "Little Getto Boy" as recorded by Donny Hathaway
Track 13 contains interpolations from "La Di Da Di" written by Slick Rick & Doug E. Fresh and "Sukiyaki" written by Rokusuke Ei & Hachidai Nakamura
Track 14 contains samples from "If It Don't Turn You On" as recorded by B. T. Express and "Do Your Thang" as recorded by Isaac Hayes
Track 16 contains samples from "In My Wildest Dreams" as recorded by Joe Sample and interpolations from "Sadie" written by Joseph B. Jefferson, Bruce Hawes & Charles Simmons
Track 17 contains samples from "Inside My Love" as recorded by Minnie Riperton and "Walk on By" as recorded by Isaac Hayes
Track 23 contains samples from "Computer Love" as recorded by Zapp
Track 25 contains interpolations from "Don't Look Any Further" written by Franne Golde, Dennis Lambert & Duane Hitchings
Track 26 contains samples from "Forget Me Nots" as recorded by Patrice Rushen
Track 28 contains samples from "Cry Together" as recorded by The O'Jays
Track 31 contains samples from "Let Me Love You" as recorded by Ray Parker Jr.

Personnel
Vocalists

Andre "Dr. Dre" Young – performer (tracks: 1, 4, 6, 11, 14, 18, 22, 24)
Calvin "Snoop Dogg" Broadus – performer (tracks: 1, 2, 5, 8, 10, 12-15, 19, 21, 29)
Robin "The Lady of Rage" Allen – performer (tracks: 3, 14)
O'Shea "Ice Cube" Jackson – performer (tracks: 4, 7)
Barbara Wilson – performer (track 6)
Dorothy Coleman – performer (track 6)
Nancy Fletcher – performer (tracks: 6, 13)
Delmar "Daz Dillinger" Arnaud – performer (tracks: 8, 10, 19, 21, 29, 30, 32)
Ricardo "Kurupt" Brown – performer (tracks: 8, 12, 14, 29, 30)
The Dramatics – performers (track 8)
Tupac Shakur – performer (tracks: 9, 16, 17, 23, 25, 28, 33)
Dave "The Black Angel" Hollister – performer (track 9)
Nathaniel "Nate Dogg" Hale – performer (track 12)
Warren Griffin – performer (track 12)
Eric "RBX" Collins – performer (track 14)
Outlawz – performers (tracks: 17, 25)
Puff Johnson – performer (track 17)
Jewell Caples – performer (tracks: 18, 27, 29)
Michel'le – performer (track 20)
Digital Underground – performers (track 23)
O.G.Enius – performer (track 24)
James "J-Flexx" Anderson – performer (track 26)
Sean "Barney Rubble" Thomas – performer (track 26)
Jodeci – performers (track 30)
"Danny Boy" Stewart – performer (track 31)
Brad "Scarface" Jordan – performer (track 33)
816 – performer (track 33)

Instrumentalists

Priest "Soopafly" Brooks – keyboards (tracks: 4, 18, 19, 21, 29, 30)
Stewart "Stu-B-Doo" Bullard – keyboards (track 6)
James "Timbali" Cornwell – percussion (tracks: 18, 23)
Fernando Harkless – horns (tracks: 18, 20, 27), flute (track 20)
Rahmlee Davis – horns (tracks: 18, 20, 27)
Steve Baxter – horns (tracks: 18, 20, 27)
Tyrone Griffin – horns (tracks: 18, 20, 27)
Cornelius "Corny" Mims – bass (tracks: 20, 23, 27)
Kevyn "Cavi" Lewis – keyboards (tracks: 20, 23, 27)
Warryn Campbell – keyboards (track 20)
Ricardo Rouse – guitar (tracks: 22, 23, 27)
Derek Organ – drums (tracks: 23, 27)
Darrel Crooks – guitar (trackS; 23, 27)
Cassandra O'Neal – keyboards (tracks: 23, 27)
Sean "Barney" Thomas – keyboards & programming (track 26)

Producers

Dr. Dre – producer (tracks: 1-6, 8, 10-15)
Daz Dillinger – producer (tracks: 3, 18, 19, 21, 29, 30, 32)
Anthony "Sir Jinx" Wheaton – producer (track 7)
"D.J. Daryl" Anderson – producer (track 9)
Tony Pizarro – producer (track 16)
Carsten "Soulshock" Schack – producer (track 17)
Kenneth Karlin – producer (track 17)
Kevyn Lewis – producer (track: 20, 23, 27), horns producer (track 18)
Kurt "Kobane" Couthon – producer (track 20)
Reggie Lamb – producer (track 20)
DJ Jam – producer (track 22)
Tommy D. Daugherty – producer (track 22)
Antonio "Tony G" Gonzalez – producer (track 24)
Julio Gonzalez – producer (track 24)
Barney Rubble – producer (track 26)
J-Flexx – producer (track 26)
Johnny "J" Lee Jackson – producer (track 28)
David "DJ Quik" Blake – producer (track 31)
Damon Thomas – producer (track 33)
2Pac – producer (track 33)
Samuel "Sam Sneed" Anderson – co-producer (tracks: 4, 6)
Terrence "DF Master Tee" Thomas – co-producer (track 16)
Moses – co-producer (track 16)
Donald "DeVante Swing" DeGrate – co-producer (track 30)
Marion Hugh "Suge" Knight Jr. – executive producer

Technical

Dr. Dre – mixing (tracks: 3, 29)
Keston Wright – engineering (track 6)
Tommy D – engineering (track 6)
Tony Pizarro – engineering (track 16)
Paul Arnold – mix engineering (track 16)
Jay Lean – mix engineering (track 17)
Soulshock – mix engineering (track 17)
Dave Aron – mixing (tracks: 19, 33), engineering (track 33)
Reggie Lamb – vocal arranger (track 20)
Lance Pierre – engineering (track 22)
Patrick Shevelin – engineering (track 22)
Norman Anthony Whitfield Jr. – mixing (track 28)
Dalvin "Mr. Dalvin" DeGrate – vocal arranger (track 30)
Brian "Big Bass" Gardner – mastering

Additional

George Pryce – art direction
Kim Holt – design
Ronald "Riskie" Brent – front cover illistration
T.J. Johnson – inlay illistration
Edge Films – photography
Ken Nahoum – photography
Suge Knight – liner notes
Roy Tesfay – project coordination
Norris Anderson – project supervision

Charts

Weekly charts

Year-end charts

Certifications

References

External links

1996 compilation albums
G-funk compilation albums
Albums produced by DJ Quik
Albums produced by Dr. Dre
Albums produced by Johnny "J"
Gangsta rap compilation albums
Record label compilation albums
Albums produced by Daz Dillinger
Rhythm and blues compilation albums
Death Row Records compilation albums
West Coast hip hop compilation albums
Albums produced by Soulshock and Karlin